Gnaeus Domitius Calvinus Maximus was a consul of the Roman Republic in 283 BC.

Biography
He became a candidate for the aedileship in 304 BC. He lost to Gnaeus Flavius. Five years later, however, he was elected. He was elevated to consul of the Roman Republic in 283 BC. He served with Publius Cornelius Dolabella.

Bibliography
 William Smith (1870). Dictionary of Greek and Roman Biography and Mythology.

4th-century BC Romans
3rd-century BC Roman consuls
Calvinus Maximus, Gnaeus